Drvar is a town and municipality located in Canton 10 of the Federation of Bosnia and Herzegovina, an entity of Bosnia and Herzegovina. The 2013 census registered the municipality as having a population of 7,036. It is situated in western Bosnia and Herzegovina, on the road between Bosansko Grahovo and Bosanski Petrovac, also near Glamoč.

Drvar lies in the vast valley, the southeastern part of Bosanska Krajina, between the Osječanica, Klekovača, Vijenca and Šator mountains of the Dinaric Alps. The southeast side of boundary extends from the Šator over Jadovnika, Uilice and descends to Lipovo and the Una River.

This extremely hilly region comprising the town of Drvar and the numerous outlying villages covers approximately 1,030 square kilometers (640 square miles). The town itself is mainly spread out from the left side of the river Unac, and its elevation is approximately 480 meters (1,574 feet).

Name
The word Drvar stems from the Slavic word "drvo" which means "wood". During the period of SFR Yugoslavia, Drvar was named Titov Drvar in honor of Josip Broz Tito.

History

Early history
The first writings on Drvar date back to the 9th century. In the first half of the 16th century (approximately 1530) residents of this area, under the leadership of a Vojnović from Glamoč, migrated to the surroundings of Zagreb (Metlika Zumberak and four surrounding villages). The greater area was populated in Roman Times as evidenced by the remains of Roman roads and.

Austro-Hungarian Rule
In 1878 Drvar, along with the rest of Bosnia, was subjugated to Austro-Hungarian rule. Around 1893 German industrialist  leased the right to exploit fir and spruce forests in the mountains of Klekovača, Lunjevače, Srnetica and Osječenica. Steinbeis operated in the area until 1918 when, after the First World War, the company was taken over by the new Yugoslav state. During the 25 years that Steinbeis operated in the area, he created a complete infrastructure for processing forest products including the construction of modern lumber mills in Drvar and Dobrljin, and the construction of a network of roads and 400 km of narrow-gauge railway, and telephone and telegraph lines. During this time Drvar grew into an industrial town employing approximately 2,800 persons in which homes, hospitals, restaurants, cafe and retails shops were built. Additional factories appeared in Drvar, including a cellulose factory opened by Alphons Simunius Blumer.

Eventually, poor labor conditions led to the first organized strikes in Drvar in 1906. These strikes continued until 1911 when the Austro-Hungarian Empire banned all such activities.

20th century
1918 saw the fall of the Austro-Hungarian Empire and the rise of the Kingdom of Serbs, Croats and Slovenes, but this did not help the plight of the workers in Drvar, who became better organized and rose up to strike again in 1921.

Kingdom of Yugoslavia
From 1929 to 1941, Drvar was part of the Vrbas Banovina of the Kingdom of Yugoslavia. In 1932, an economic crisis resulted in the layoff of 2,000 workers.

World War II

On April 10, Ustaše, aligned with Nazi Germany, declared the Independent State of Croatia (NDH) and claimed as part of its territory the entire area known as Bosnia and Herzegovina. In Drvar, this resulted in the beginning of the presence of the Ustaše government, the movement chiefly responsible for the World War II Holocaust in the Independent State of Croatia in which Serbs, Jews, Roma, Croat and Bosniak resistance members and political opponents were sent to concentration camps and killed. In the beginning the Ustaše contingent in Drvar consisted of the Croatian population residing in Drvar, but they were soon reinforced by others who came from outside Drvar.

In June 1941 Ustaše arrested a large group of prominent Drvar citizens, and took them to Risovac near Bosanski Petrovac, where they were tortured, killed and thrown into a pit. After Ustaše imprisoned all Serb men from Drvar during June and July 1941, they began with preparation to imprison and kill all Serbs from Drvar, regardless of their age and sex, including all women and children. 

The genocidal activities of the Ustaše forced targeted Serb population to organize an uprising known as Drvar uprising. The rebels were organized into Kamenički, Javorje, Crljivičko-zaglavički, Boboljusko-cvjetnički, Trubarski, Mokronog and Tičevski, and Grahovo area Grahovsko-resanovski guerrilla detachments.

In more recent history, Drvar is perhaps most famous as the location of a daring airdrop raid on Drvar, codenamed "Operation Rösselsprung", on May 25, 1944, by Nazi German invaders, in an attempt to assassinate Tito. Tito, the main Partisan commander, was sheltered in the Partisan General Staff headquarters in what is now called "Tito's Cave" in the hills near Drvar at the time.

During the 4 years and 1 months of the war, Drvar was under occupation for just 390 days. 767 Drvar civilians were killed and only 13 pre-war houses still stood. Approximately 93% of the infrastructure of the town was destroyed, and the livestock population had been reduced by more than 80%.

Drvar was first occupied by the German army in April 1941, followed shortly thereafter by the Italians. Drvar continued to experience fierce fighting through mid-1942 when the last of the German and Italian forces were expelled. The Germans re-entered Drvar in 1943 and left it a burned ruin when they departed.

During the summer 1941, Chetniks expelled and killed Croat and Catholic civilians in Drvar area. The most significant event was the Trubar massacre, a civilian massacre committed by Chetniks on 27 July 1941.

SFR Yugoslavia
In the years following the war, Drvar was rebuilt, its timber industry restored, and new metal, fabrication, and carpet industries developed. Eventually, electricity was brought to outlying villages. Over time, it became a tourist destination attracting approximately 200,000 visitors a year, primarily to Tito's Cave, and on November 24, 1981, Drvar changed its name to Titov Drvar.

Bosnian War

In September 1995, Drvar, as well as some other municipalities, was taken over by Croatian forces, and the Serb population fled. Many of them moved to Banja Luka. During this period, Drvar was nearly deserted. Leading up to 1995, Drvar was populated almost entirely by Bosnian Serbs. During the Bosnian War between 1992 and 1995, Drvar was controlled by what is now called the Republika Srpska.

On 3 August 1995, the Croatian Armed Forces with the help of Bosnian Croats began shelling Drvar, from the mountain of Šator. Two Drvar citizens were killed and older men and women began to evacuate to Petrovac. One day later, the Croatian Government armed forces began "Operation Storm", called by European Union Special Envoy to the Former Yugoslavia Carl Bildt, "the most efficient ethnic cleansing we've seen in the Balkans", in the "Dalmatinska zagora" region of Croatia, and columns of hundreds of thousands of refugees in cars, on tractors, wagons and on foot began to pass through Drvar as they fled their homes in Croatia. The shelling on the outlying areas of Drvar by Croatian Government forces was renewed and continued for days.

Aftermath
In late 1995, after the Dayton Peace Accord was signed, Drvar became part of the Federation of Bosnia and Herzegovina, after which Croat politicians enticed up to 6,000 Bosnian Croats, mainly displaced persons from central Bosnia, to move to Drvar, by promising such things as jobs and keys to vacant homes. A further 2,500 Croat HVO troops and their families were stationed there, also occupying the homes of displaced Bosnian Serb citizens. This drastically changed the population and from 1995 to 1999 the population was primarily Croatian.

In 1996, small numbers of Serbs began to try to return to their homes but faced harassment and discrimination by the Croats. The return continued nonetheless despite the ongoing looting and burning of their homes in 1996–1998.

In 1998, Croat opposition to the return of displaced Bosnian Serb citizens culminated in riots and murders. Buildings and houses were torched, United Nations International Police Task Force personnel, SFOR personnel and Mayor, Mile Marceta (elected with Serb refugee votes) were attacked, and two displaced elderly Serbs who had recently returned to Drvar were murdered.

Much of the damage done to the town of Drvar was done not during the war, but during its subsequent occupation by Croat civilians and military personnel as the homes and business of displaced Bosnian Serbs attempting to return to Drvar were looted and burned. The local government and companies, the few that exist, are dominated by the Croats, and Serbs have difficulty finding employment.

Modern
Since the end of the Bosnian War, about 5,000 Bosnian Serb residents have returned to Drvar. However, unemployment in the town stands at 80% and many residents blame the government of the Federation of Bosnia and Herzegovina for the poor economic situation.

In September 2019, the President of Serbia Aleksandar Vučić made an official visit to Drvar, along with the Serb Member of the Presidency of Bosnia and Herzegovina Milorad Dodik.

Drvar is a member of the Alliance of Serb Municipalities.

Settlements
Aside from the town of Drvar, the following settlements comprise the municipality:

 Ataševac
 Bastasi
 Brda
 Bunčevac
 Drvar Selo
 Gruborski Naslon
 Kamenica
 Ljeskovica
 Mokronoge
 Motike
 Mrđe
 Podić
 Podovi
 Poljice
 Potoci
 Prekaja
 Šajinovac
 Šipovljani
 Trninić Brijeg
 Trubar
 Vidovo Selo
 Vrtoče
 Zaglavica
 Župa
 Župica

Demographics

Population

Ethnic composition

Economy

Drvar was already well known in the Austrian-Hungarian era due to the high-quality wood coming from that area. The Drvar area is still one of the largest logging and wood-processing environments in BiH. One of the major problems in this area is the widespread corruption connected to this wood-processing industry. It is estimated that during 2004 about 110,000m 3 of wood 'disappeared'. Average price of 1m 3 of timber (second class) is about 100 BAM (100 Convertible Mark=49.5 Euros).

Features
A "Desant na Drvar" is a movie made about the German attack on Drvar. There are still some locations in area, which were heavily fought over in that period, that still seem to be untouched by time.

Famous landmarks include "Tito's Cave" and the so-called "Citadel". At the latter mentioned location one can find an Austrian-Hungarian cemetery (in a very poor state) which may contain some (unknown) number of German soldiers buried after the attack of 1944. On this spot there is also a Roman road sign (+/- 100 AD). Another one can be found on the way to Bosanski Petrovac near Zaglavica.

Drvar is also renowned for its local rakija, a type of plum or cranberry brandy, originating in Serbia but popular all over the Balkans.

Notable people
Petar Pećanac, first man who climbed Mount Everest from BIH and Republika Srpska in 2007
Saša Adamović, doctor of cryptology
Andrea Arsović, sports shooting
Radomir Kovačević, Olympic medalist in judo
Milan Rodić, professional football player
Marija Bursać, National Hero of Yugoslavia
Mika Bosnić, national hero
Nikola Špirić, Former Prime Minister of Bosnia and Herzegovina
Dejan Matić, singer
Saša Matić, singer

See also
Canton 10

References

Sources

External links

 
Serb communities in the Federation of Bosnia and Herzegovina